Sultan of Turkey may refer to:

 List of sultans of the Ottoman Empire
 Sultan of Turkey (card game), a patience or card solitaire